Walter Edward Edelen (September 9, 1911 – November 18, 1991) was an American politician and businessman.

Born in Brooklyn, Iowa, Edelen graduated from Brooklyn High School. He worked in the grocery business and was involved with the real estate business. Edelen lived in Garner, Iowa. He was also a farmer. Edelen served in the Iowa State Senate from 1959 to 1961 and was a Democrat. From 1963 to 1969, Edelen served on the Iowa Liquor Commission and was chairman of the commission. Edelen died in a hospital in Mason City, Iowa. His brother was Rollin Edelen who also served in the Iowa General Assembly.

Notes

1911 births
1991 deaths
People from Garner, Iowa
People from Poweshiek County, Iowa
Businesspeople from Iowa
Farmers from Iowa
Democratic Party Iowa state senators
20th-century American politicians
20th-century American businesspeople